Oraon may refer to:

 Oraon people, an ethnic group of India
 Oraon language, a Dravidian language

Persons with the surname 
 Dinesh Oraon, politician
 Kartik Oraon, politician
 Lalit Oraon, politician
 Laloo Oraon, politician
 Manoj Kumar Oraon, politician
 Rameshwar Oraon, politician
 Sameer Oraon, politician
 Shankar Oraon, football player
 Shivshankar Oraon, politician
 Simon Oraon, environmentalist
 Subodh Oraon, politician
 Sukhram Oraon, politician
 Sumati Oraon, politician
 Tuna Oraon, politician